The Ngaiawang (Ngayawang) were an Aboriginal Australian people of the western Riverland area of South Australia, with a language considered part of the Lower Murray group. They are now considered extinct. They have sometimes been referred to as part of the Meru people, a larger grouping which could also include the Ngawait and Erawirung peoples. They were called Birta by the Kaurna and Ngadjuri peoples, variations of Murundi by the Jarildekald people, and were also known various other terms and spellings.

Language

The Ngayawung language belonged to the Lower Murray language branch of the Pama–Nyungan family.

Country
The Ngaiawang lived in an area of some  ranging along the Murray River from Herman Landing (Nildottie) to Penn Reach (near Qualco). The western boundary was formed by the scarp of the Mount Lofty Ranges. To the south, the tribal territory ended at Ngautngaut (Devon Downs) rock shelter, the first area to be subject to archaeological excavation (by Norman Tindale and Herbert Hale of the South Australian Museum) and the first formal archaeological excavation undertaken in Australia.

Society
The Ngaiawang consisted of some ten clans or peoples, among which were the Molo people. They did not practice circumcision, and were derided for this by the Kaurna, whose derogative exonym for them, Paruru, meant "uncircumcised" or "animal".

History
The first recorded encounter of the Ngaiawang with Europeans occurred when the explorer Edward John Eyre came across them at Lake Bonney. When Eyre returned to England in 1845, onboard the Symmetry, he took two Ngaiawang boys with him, one of who was Warrulan.

Alternative names

 Aiawung, Aiawong (given by Eyre, who, according to Tindale, was tone deaf to the initial ng sound).
 Birta (Kaurna and Ngadjuri term)
 Iawung Karn-brikolenbola (horde at Moorunde).
 Meru (term for man).
 Moorunde, Moorundee, Moorundie Murundi (Jarildekald term for the Murray River upriver from Lake Alexandrina and place name south of Blanchetown).
 Naiawu (a language name); Niawoo Ngaiawung Ngaijawa, Ngaiyawa Ngaiyau Nggauaiyo-wangko Paruru (Kaurna term meaning "uncircumcised" (also "animal") to denote the Ngaiawang and other Murray River tribes
 Pijita, Pitta, Pieta, Peeita Wakanuwan'' (name applied by the Jarildekald to this, the Nganguruku, and other tribes; they called the language Walkalde).

Source:

Notes

Citations

Sources

Aboriginal peoples of South Australia